Iqbal Dawood Pakwala is a Pakistani businessman and former provincial minister of Sindh in 2013 in a caretaker capacity. He was assigned the food portfolio the following month.

In July 2013, Pakwala was arrested for his involvement in a multi-billion dollar scam involving the Employees Old-Age Benefits Institution (EOBI).

References

Living people
Pakistani people of Gujarati descent
Pakistani industrialists
Pakistani prisoners and detainees
Provincial ministers of Sindh
Year of birth missing (living people)